Xuwulong is a genus of hadrosauroid dinosaur from the Early Cretaceous period. It lived during the early Cretaceous period (Aptian-Albian age) in what is now Yujingzi Basin in the Jiuquan area, Gansu Province of northwestern China. It is known from the holotype – GSGM F00001, an articulated specimen including a complete cranium, almost complete axial skeleton, and complete left pelvic girdle from Xinminpu Group. Xuwulong was named by You Hailu, Li Daqing and Liu Weichang in 2011 and the type species is Xuwulong yueluni; the binomial name as a whole refers to Professor Wang Yue-lun; "Xu-wu" is his courtesy name.

See also

References

Early Cretaceous dinosaurs of Asia
Iguanodonts
Fossil taxa described in 2011
Paleontology in Gansu
Ornithischian genera